is a common Japanese given name which is mostly used for males.

Possible writings
Shin can be written using different kanji characters and can mean:
真, "true"
伸, "extend"
新, "new"
心, "heart"
信, "belief"
進, "progress"
慎, "humility"
晋, "advance"
紳, "gentleman"
The name can also be written in hiragana or katakana.

People with the given name
Shin Amano (真, born 1973), Japanese figure skater
Shin Hirayama (信, 1868–1945), Japanese astronomer
Shin Kishida (森, 1939–1982), Japanese actor
Shin Kanemaru (信, 1914–1996), Japanese politician
Shin Kanazawa (born 1983), Japanese football player
, Japanese Go player
Shin Koyamada (真, born 1982), Japanese and American film actor
Shin Kusaka (慎), a Japanese actor
, Japanese footballer
Shin Ōnuma (心), a Japanese animation and theatre director
Shin Saburi (信, 1909–1982), Japanese film actor
Shō Shin (1465–1526), king of the Ryūkyū Kingdom
Shin Takahashi (しん, born 1967), Japanese manga artist
Shin Terai, a Japanese musician and producer
, Japanese film director
Shin Tsuchida (土田慎, born 1990), Japanese politician
, Japanese ice hockey player
Shin Yanagisawa (信, 1936–2008), Japanese photographer
Shin (シン), a Japanese singer (former member of the Visual-Kei band ViViD)

Fictional characters
Shin Mitsurugi (御剣 信) a.k.a. Gregory Edgeworth, a character in the Ace Attorney videogame franchise.

Shin, a.k.a. Kaioushin or Supreme Kai, a character in Dragon Ball universe.

Japanese masculine given names